Dance First is an upcoming bio-pic of Irish playwright Samuel Beckett, starring Gabriel Byrne as Beckett, directed by James Marsh, and written by Neil Forsyth. The film also features Fionn O'Shea as a younger Beckett and Aidan Gillen as James Joyce.

Synopsis
The film documents the Irish writer’s life, from his time as a fighter for the French Resistance during the Second World War, to his literary rise and subsequent Nobel Prize for Literature in 1969, and his later life as a recluse.

Cast
Gabriel Byrne as Samuel Beckett
Fionn O'Shea as younger Beckett 
Aidan Gillen as James Joyce
Maxine Peake as Barbara 
Sandrine Bonnaire 
Robert Aramayo
Bronagh Gallagher as Nora Barnacle
Lisa Dwyer Hogg as May Beckett
Barry O’Connor as William Beckett
Gráinne Good as Lucia Joyce
Caroline Boulton as Sylvia Beach

Production
In November 2021 it www announced that James Marsh was to direct the bio-pic with Gabriel Byrne playing Beckett from a screenplay from Neil Forsyth and a title taken from Beckett’s ethos on life of “Dance first, think later”. The project has been developed with Sky Arts in the U.K. and produced by 2LE Media’s Michael Livingstone and Tom Thostrup, alongside Viktória Petrányi of Hungary’s Proton Cinema and Belgium’s Umedia.

Casting
The project isn’t the first time Forsyth has written about Beckett, his Sky Playhouse short film Waiting for Andre was about the real-life friendship between Beckett and a teenage Andre the Giant. In May 2022 it was announced that Aidan Gillen has joined the cast along with Sandrine Bonnaire and Fionn O'Shea as a younger Samuel Beckett. Gillen confirmed to The Times that his role was that of James Joyce and that Marsh is “a great film-maker, so the Beckett story is in good hands.” In September 2022 it was revealed that Maxine Peake, Robert Aramayo, Leonie Lojkine, Bronagh Gallagher, Lisa Dwyer Hogg, Barry O’Connor and Gráinne Good had joined the cast.

Filming
Principal photography began in Budapest in May, 2022. Filming locations in Budapest included the corner of Gerlóczy utca and Vitkovics Mihály utca, the steps of the Vígszínház, Dohány utca and the New York Kávéház.

On set in Budapest Byrne was interviewed by The Guardian and described the project as an effort to flesh out a character whom “people know very little about. He was a man who had a sense of humour, who was deeply emotional, who was a failure in his own eyes for a great deal of his life”. Byrne described how the man’s sense of self contrasts greatly with the global notoriety and fame that came from being subsequently awarded the Nobel prize, and yet how he remained a man “who lived the last part of his life alone in a very simple room in a nursing home”. Discussing his performance Byrne said “Physically I can sketch him, but with this film we are not looking for an impersonation of Beckett, rather a sense of who he was. What you want is people to believe the man, not focus their attention on the wig or the makeup or the false nose.”

Release
The film is expected to premiere in cinemas and on Sky Cinema in the UK in 2023.

References

External links
 

Biographical films
21st-century biographical films
2020s biographical films
British biographical drama films
Films directed by James Marsh
Biographical films about writers
Biographical films about dramatists and playwrights
Films about Nobel laureates
Films shot in Budapest
Upcoming films